Arthur Gardner Rankin Sr. (August 30, 1895 – March 23, 1947) was an American film actor.

Personal life
Arthur Rankin was born in New York, the son of actress Phyllis Rankin. She later married actor Harry Davenport, who adopted Arthur. He was the nephew of Mr. and Mrs. Sidney Drew. Rankin served in the United States Marine Corps during World War I, and received a medical discharge in 1918. He then joined the British Army. During World War II, Rankin rejoined the Marine Corps. Rankin married Marian Mansfield, and they had two sons, one of them being animator Arthur Rankin Jr.. He died on March 22, 1947, of a cerebral hemorrhage.

Selected filmography

 Silas Marner (1916)
 The Truth About Husbands (1920)
 The Great Adventure (1921)
 The Lure of Jade (1921)
 The Five Dollar Baby (1922)
 To Have and to Hold (1922)
 The Call of the Canyon (1923)
 Discontented Husbands (1924)
 Vanity's Price (1924)
 Broken Laws (1924)
 The Fearless Lover (1925)
 Tearing Through (1925)
 Speed (1925)
 Sun-Up (1925)
 Pursued (1925)
 The Love Gamble (1925)
 The Sporting Lover (1926)
 The Man in the Shadow (1926)
 The Hidden Way (1926)
 The Millionaire Policeman (1926)
 Riding to Fame (1927)
 The Woman Who Did Not Care (1927)
 The Blood Ship (1927)
 Slightly Used (1927)
 The Adventurous Soul (1927)
 The Wife's Relations (1928)
 Domestic Troubles (1928)
 Walking Back (1928)
 Say It with Sables (1928)
 Making the Varsity (1928)
 Runaway Girls (1928)
 Submarine (1928)
 Code of the Air (1928)
 Ships of the Night (1928)
 Companionate Marriage (1928)
 Below the Deadline (1929)
 The Fall of Eve (1929)
 The Unwritten Law (1932)
 Trailing North (1933)
 The Thrill Hunter (1933)
 Men of the Night (1934)
 Unknown Woman (1935)
 The Public Menace (1935)
 Case of the Missing Man (1935)
 Roaming Lady (1936)
 The Cowboy Star (1936)
 Two-Fisted Gentleman (1936)
 Midnight Taxi (1937)
 Second Honeymoon (1937)
 Thanks for Everything (1938)
 Quick Millions (1939)
 Here I Am a Stranger (1939)

See also
Arthur Rankin Jr.

References

Bibliography
 Munden, Kenneth White. The American Film Institute Catalog of Motion Pictures Produced in the United States, Part 1. University of California Press, 1997.

External links

1895 births
1947 deaths
American male film actors
American male silent film actors
20th-century American male actors
People from New York City